Rated O is the tenth full-length album by Brooklyn-based indie rock band by Oneida, released as a triple LP.

Track listing

References

2009 albums
Oneida (band) albums